Suffield is a hamlet in southern Alberta, Canada within Cypress County.

History 
Established by the Canadian Pacific Railway (CPR) in 1884, Suffield was named after Charles Harbord, 5th Baron Suffield who married in 1854, Cecilia Annetta, the sister of Edward Baring, 1st Baron Revelstoke, who assisted in financing the railway.

Near the beginning of the 20th century, Suffield experienced rapid growth arising from the construction of the CPR.  One of the larger buildings in the area at the time, the 32-room Alamo Hotel was constructed in 1910 by W.R. Martin, superintendent of CPR oil and gas exploration, A.M. Grace, chief engineer of the Southern Alberta Land Company, and A.P. Phillips at a cost of $30,000. A reporter from the Medicine Hat News wrote on 20 Oct 1910, "The most beautiful hotel alongside the CPR from Winnipeg to Calgary, stands on the prairie within a stone's throw of one of the biggest gas wells in the Medicine Hat district in what promises to be, in the near future, the city of Suffield". The hotel hosted a 40-foot stand-up bar and was reported to be one of the finest in the country.  Hard times hit with the First World War and with the introduction of Prohibition in 1915.  In 1926, the hotel was sold to the Calgary Brewing and Malting Company and moved to Sylvan Lake in 1927 to replace a hotel that burnt down.

Railway 
In 1913, a branch line of the CPR was constructed between Suffield and Retlaw.  In 1914, the Suffield-Retlaw was extended to Lomond, completing the 84-mile branch. The Suffield-Lomond line was extended to Arrowwood in 1925.  In 1930, the line was extended to Eltham on the Kipp-Aldersyde line near Blackie.  The stops on the line were Suffield, Agatha, Hlingworth, Ronolane, Cecil, Armelgra, Scope, Grantham, Vauxhall, Retlaw, Enchant, Travers, Lomond, Armada, Pageant, Milo, Qeenstown, Shouldice and Arrowwood.  The coach fare in 1948 was $3.75. The line has since been abandoned and the rails removed.

Climate 
Suffield experiences a semi-arid climate (Köppen climate classification BSk) with long, cold, dry winters and short but very warm summers. Precipitation is low, with an annual average of 318 mm, and is concentrated in the warmer months.

Demographics 

See also 
British Army Training Unit Suffield
Canadian Forces Base Suffield
List of communities in Alberta
List of designated places in Alberta
List of former urban municipalities in Alberta
List of hamlets in Alberta

References 

Cypress County
Hamlets in Alberta
Designated places in Alberta
Former villages in Alberta